Lithuania participated in the Eurovision Song Contest 2014 with the song "Attention" written by Vilija Matačiūnaitė and Viktoras Vaupšas. The song was performed by Vilija, which is the artistic name of Matačiūnaitė. The Lithuanian broadcaster Lithuanian National Radio and Television (LRT) organised the national final "Eurovizijos" dainų konkurso nacionalinė atranka (Eurovision Song Contest national selection) in order to select the Lithuanian entry for the 2014 contest in Copenhagen, Denmark. The national final took place over 12 weeks and involved 20 artists and 16 songs competing in two different competitive streams. The results of each show were determined by the combination of votes from a jury panel and a public vote, and "Attention" performed by Vilija eventually emerged as the winner following the final.

Lithuania was drawn to compete in the second semi-final of the Eurovision Song Contest which took place on 8 May 2014. Performing during the show in position 7, "Attention" was not announced among the top 10 entries of the second semi-final and therefore did not qualify to compete in the final. It was later revealed that Lithuania placed 11th out of the 15 participating countries in the semi-final with 36 points.

Background 

Prior to the 2014 contest, Lithuania had participated in the Eurovision Song Contest 14 times since its first entry in 1994. The nation’s best placing in the contest was sixth, which it achieved in 2006 with the song "We Are the Winners" performed by LT United. Following the introduction of semi-finals in 2004, Lithuania, to this point, has managed to qualify to the final six times. In the 2013 contest, "Something" performed by Andrius Pojavis qualified to the final where the song scored 17 points and placed 22nd.

For the 2014 contest, the Lithuanian national broadcaster, Lithuanian National Radio and Television (LRT), broadcast the event within Lithuania and organised the selection process for the nation's entry. Other than the internal selection of their debut entry in 1994, Lithuania has selected their entry consistently through a national final procedure. LRT confirmed their intentions to participate at the 2014 Eurovision Song Contest on 3 October 2013 and announced the organization of "Eurovizijos" dainų konkurso nacionalinė atranka, which would be the national final to select Lithuania's entry for Copenhagen.

Before Eurovision

"Eurovizijos" dainų konkurso nacionalinė atranka 
"Eurovizijos" dainų konkurso nacionalinė atranka (Eurovision Song Contest national selection) was the national final format developed by LRT in order to select Lithuania's entry for the Eurovision Song Contest 2014. The competition involved a 12-week-long process that commenced on 21 December 2013 and concluded with a winning song on 23 February 2014 and a winning artist on 1 March 2014. The 12 shows took place at the LRT studios in Vilnius and were hosted by Simona Nainė and Arūnas Valinskas. The shows were broadcast on LRT televizija, LRT Lituanica and LRT Radijas as well as online via the broadcaster's website lrt.lt. The final was also streamed online at the official Eurovision Song Contest website eurovision.tv.

Format 
The Lithuanian broadcaster overhauled the format of the national final from that of previous years. The 2014 competition consisted of 12 shows and involved artists competing independently from songs, potentially being paired with any of the songs that were selected for the competition. The rules stated that composers were required to agree to the condition that their song may be offered to an artist they did not originally write the song for. The first show was a jubilee concert where 15 of the 20 competing artists participated in a celebration of past Lithuanian Eurovision songs and no elimination took place. From the second to 10th shows, the artists performed covers that related to the theme of that particular show and the potential Eurovision songs. The second and third show consisted of ten artists each and five were eliminated. During each of the fourth to 10th shows, one artist was eliminated and the remaining three artists advanced in the competition. Starting from the fifth show, the 16 potential Eurovision songs competed on a weekly basis and a total of 13 songs were eliminated following the 10th show, leaving three songs remaining. The 11th show was the competition's semi-final where only the winning song was selected from the remaining three songs, while the twelfth show was the final where the winning artist-song combination was selected from the remaining three artists. The format of the competition was originally set to take place over a ten-week period where four artists would participate in the final, however, an additional two elimination shows were held after LRT experienced success in the ratings with the elimination shows.

The results of each of the 12 shows were determined by the 50/50 combination of votes from a jury panel and public televoting. During the first 11 shows, the jury votes consisted of a Lithuanian jury panel consisting of four members and an international jury panel consisting of three members. The members of the international panel each assigned points from 1-8, 10 and 12 and assigned based on the number of competing songs in the respective show, while the Lithuanian panel was required to come to a consensus in order to assign one score from 1 to 10 to each artist between the second and fifth shows and one set of points from 1-8, 10 and 12 between the sixth and 11th shows. In the final, a two-member Lithuanian panel and the three-member international panel voted. The public could vote through telephone and SMS voting. Ties in the elimination shows and the semi-final were decided in favour of the entry that received the most votes from the public, while in the final, a tie would be decided in favour of the entry that was awarded the most points by the jury.

Competing artists and songs
On 2 October 2013, LRT opened two separate submission forms: one for artists and another for songwriters to submit their songs. The submission deadline for both applications concluded on 15 November 2013. On 28 December 2013, LRT announced the 20 artists selected for the competition. Among the artists was previous Lithuanian Eurovision contestant Sasha Song, who represented Lithuania in 2009. The 16 potential Eurovision songs selected from 106 submissions received were announced for listening and voting on 12 January 2014.

Artist and song progress in the shows

Artists

Songs

Shows

Elimination shows
The ten elimination shows of the competition aired between 14 December 2013 and 15 February 2014 and featured the twenty competing artists. The members of the Lithuanian jury consisted of Ramūnas Zilnys (music reviewer; second to 10th shows), Vytenis Pauliukaitis (director; second to fourth and sixth to 10th shows), Jurga Šeduikytė (singer-songwriter; second show), Edmundas Seilius (opera singer; second to ninth shows), Adrija Čepaitė (conductor; third and seventh show), Ieva Prudnikovaitė-Pitrėnė (opera singer; fourth and fifth show), Darius Užkuraitis (LRT Opus director; fifth to sixth and nine to 10th shows) and Sigutė Stonytė (opera singer; eighth and 10th show). International jury members for all shows included Brandon Stone (German music producer and composer), Valerij Prosvirov (Russian producer and record label director) and Liselott Björk (Swedish singer and vocal coach). In the first four shows, the artists performed covers that related to the theme of that particular show: past Lithuanian Eurovision songs in the jubilee concert, past Eurovision songs in the second show, Lithuanian hit songs in the third show and worldwide hit songs in the fourth show. No elimination took place during the jubilee concert, while the second and third show each featured ten artists and the bottom five were eliminated. One artist was eliminated in each of the fourth and fifth shows and the remaining eight artists in the competition performed the potential Eurovision songs starting from the sixth show. The artists each performed one song in the sixth and seventh shows and two songs between the eighth to 10th shows, and one artist was eliminated per show.

For the ninth elimination show, LRT opted to delay the announcement of the results until 10 February 2014 after conducting an investigation in regards to voting fraud. On 10 February, LRT announced that the televote score for Martynas Kavaliauskas had been reduced from 1,332 to 655 as it was discovered that a mobile operator was inflating Kavaliauskas' votes. This ultimately led to the elimination of Kavaliauskas from the competition as he ranked last by both the jury vote and the public vote.

Song selection 
The 16 potential Eurovision songs were evaluated by the public through an internet vote on LRT's voting platform over four rounds. Voting in the first round was to take place between 11 and 18 January 2014, however, it was extended by a week until 25 January 2014 due to a change in the format of the competition. The first round resulted in the elimination of four songs, while the second and third round resulted in the elimination of two songs each. The bottom five songs were eliminated following the fourth round and the top three advanced to the semi-final. The results of all rounds were determined by the 50/50 combination of votes from a jury panel and public voting on LRT's internet platform.

Semi-final
The semi-final of the competition aired on 23 February 2014 and featured each of the remaining three artists that qualified from the 10th elimination show each performing the remaining three potential Eurovision songs. The show was originally scheduled to air on 22 February 2014; however, it was postponed due to LRT broadcasting live coverage of Euromaidan in Ukraine. The members of the Lithuanian jury consisted of Vytenis Pauliukaitis (director), Deivydas Zvonkus (lead singer of the group B'Avarija), Ramūnas Zilnys (music reviewer) and Edmundas Seilius (opera singer). International jury members included Brandon Stone (German music producer and composer), Valerij Prosvirov (Russian producer and record label director) and Liselott Björk (Swedish singer and vocal coach). The combination of the jury vote and the public vote resulted in a tie between two songs with 22 points each: "Attention" and "Take a Look at Me Now". "Attention" was declared the winning song as it received the most votes from the public.

Final
The final of the competition took place on 1 March 2014 and featured the remaining three artists that qualified from the 10th elimination show each performing two songs: a cover of their choice and the winning song selected from the semi-final, "Attention". The final was the only show in the competition to be broadcast live; all other preceding shows were pre-recorded earlier in the week before their airdates. Jury voting in the final was decided by a two-member Lithuanian panel and a three-member international panel. The members of the Lithuanian panel consisted of Sigutė Stonytė (opera singer) and Lauras Lučiūnas (producer). The international panel consisted of Brandon Stone (German music producer and composer), Valerij Prosvirov (Russian producer and record label director) and Liselott Björk (Swedish singer and vocal coach). Vilija Matačiūnaitė was selected as the winner after gaining the most points from both the jury vote and the public vote. In addition to the performances of the competing artists, Monika Linkytė performed as the interval act.

Preparation 
Following Vilija Matačiūnaitė's win during the Lithuanian national final, the singer recorded the final version of "Attention" at Studio 301 in Sydney with technical production by Sameer Sengupta. The final version was released on 28 March. Earlier on 15 March, LRT broadcast the support concert Būkime kartu where Lithuanian viewers could call to donate funds to support the Lithuanian Eurovision participation. The concert featured guests Jurga Šeduikytė, Ramūnas Rudokas, Marius Jampolskis, Pop Ladies and Sasha Song, and raised 48,000 LTL from the public donations.

Promotion 
Vilija specifically promoted "Attention" as the Lithuanian Eurovision entry on 5 April 2014 by performing during the Eurovision in Concert event which was held at the Melkweg venue in Amsterdam, Netherlands and hosted by Cornald Maas and Sandra Reemer.

At Eurovision

According to Eurovision rules, all nations with the exceptions of the host country and the "Big Five" (France, Germany, Italy, Spain and the United Kingdom) are required to qualify from one of two semi-finals in order to compete for the final; the top ten countries from each semi-final progress to the final. The European Broadcasting Union (EBU) split up the competing countries into six different pots based on voting patterns from previous contests, with countries with favourable voting histories put into the same pot. On 20 January 2014, an allocation draw was held which placed each country into one of the two semi-finals, as well as which half of the show they would perform in. Lithuania was placed into the second semi-final, to be held on 8 May 2014, and was scheduled to perform in the first half of the show.

Once all the competing songs for the 2014 contest had been released, the running order for the semi-finals was decided by the shows' producers rather than through another draw, so that similar songs were not placed next to each other. Lithuania was set to perform in position 7, following the entry from Austria and before the entry from Finland.

The two semi-finals and final were broadcast in Lithuania on LRT televizija and LRT Radijas with commentary by Darius Užkuraitis. The Lithuanian spokesperson, who announced the Lithuanian votes during the final, was Ignas Krupavičius.

Controversy 
Just before the announcement that Lithuania's ten points had been awarded to Austria, Krupavičius said referring to Conchita Wurst's beard, "Now it is time to shave", then pulled out a razor and pretended to shave his own face, before giggling at the joke. Host Nikolaj Koppel replied to that by saying, "Time to shave? I think not." BBC commentator Graham Norton also expressed his frustration at the joke and supported Koppel's reply.

Semi-final 
Vilija took part in technical rehearsals on 30 April and 3 May, followed by dress rehearsals on 7 and 8 May. This included the jury show on 7 May where the professional juries of each country watched and voted on the competing entries.

The Lithuanian performance featured Vilija performing expressive choreography on stage with a dancer. The stage floor displayed turquoise colours and the LED screens displayed predominantly grey, black and white colours with flashing lights and pieces of broken glass. The performance also featured smoke effects. The dancer joining Vilija was Šarūnas Kirdeikis, while three backing vocalists were also on stage: Eglė Gadeikytė, Algė Matekūnaitė and Lina Žilinskaitė. Kirdeikis previously represented Lithuania in 2010 as part of InCulto.

At the end of the show, Lithuania was not announced among the top 10 entries in the second semi-final and therefore failed to qualify to compete in the final. It was later revealed that Lithuania placed 11th in the semi-final, receiving a total of 36 points.

Voting 
Voting during the three shows consisted of 50 percent public televoting and 50 percent from a jury deliberation. The jury consisted of five music industry professionals who were citizens of the country they represent, with their names published before the contest to ensure transparency. This jury was asked to judge each contestant based on: vocal capacity; the stage performance; the song's composition and originality; and the overall impression by the act. In addition, no member of a national jury could be related in any way to any of the competing acts in such a way that they cannot vote impartially and independently. The individual rankings of each jury member were released shortly after the final.

Following the release of the full split voting by the EBU after the conclusion of the competition, it was revealed that Lithuania had placed 11th with both the public televote and the jury vote in the second semi-final. In the public vote, Lithuania scored 41 points, while with the jury vote, Lithuania scored 44 points.

Below is a breakdown of points awarded to Lithuania and awarded by Lithuania in the second semi-final and final of the contest, and the breakdown of the jury voting and televoting conducted during the two shows:

Points awarded to Lithuania

Points awarded by Lithuania

Detailed voting results
The following members comprised the Lithuanian jury:
  (jury chairperson)composer
 journalist, lyricist
 Povilas Varvuolisradio DJ, television multicamera director
 Kristina Zmailaitėopera singer
 Kristina Žaldokaitėchoir conductor, singer

References

2014
Countries in the Eurovision Song Contest 2014
Eurovision
Articles containing video clips